Allan C. Hutchinson, FRSC (born 1951) is a British-Canadian lawyer and legal theorist who is currently a Distinguished Research professor at York University.

References

1951 births
Living people
Academic staff of York University
Alumni of the University of London
Lawyers in Ontario
Place of birth missing (living people)
Fellows of the Royal Society of Canada
Alumni of the University of Manchester
Date of birth missing (living people)